Auricularia is a genus of fungi in the family Auriculariaceae. Basidiocarps (fruit bodies) are typically gelatinous and ear-shaped, with a slightly downy to conspicuously hirsute upper surface and an under surface that is smooth, wrinkled or veined. All species grow on wood. Several Auricularia species are edible and commercially cultivated on a large scale in China and East Asia.

Taxonomy

The genus was first introduced in 1780 by French mycologist Pierre Bulliard for a range of different fungi producing fruit bodies with an ear-like shape. In 1822 Christian Hendrik Persoon restricted the genus to two gelatinous species, Auricularia mesenterica (which became the type species) and A. sambuci (a synonym of Auricularia auricula-judae). In 1848 Swedish mycologist Elias Magnus Fries accepted A. mesenterica within the genus but, on the basis of differences in fruitbody appearance, introduced a new genus, Hirneola, for most other species. This division into two genera was maintained by some authors until at least the 1960s, though American mycologist Bernard Lowy's monograph of the genus had accepted Hirneola as a synonym of Auricularia in 1952 .

Molecular research, based on cladistic analysis of DNA sequences, has shown that Auricularia (including Hirneola) forms a natural, monophyletic grouping. It has also shown that many species are more restricted in distribution than previously thought, resulting in the description of additional new taxa.

Description 
The fruitbodies occur singly or in clusters. The upper surface is finely pilose to densely hirsute. The spore-bearing underside is smooth, wrinkled, veined, or reticulate (net-like). Unpigmented white forms are occasionally encountered.

Microscopic characters 
The spore-producing basidia are tubular, laterally septate, and (in some species) up to 100 µm long. The spores are allantoid (sausage-shaped), and (in some species) up to 22 µm long. When sectioned, some species show a central, medulla layer of parallel hyphae, others lack such a layer.

Habitat, ecology and distribution
All species grow on wood and are saprotrophic wood-rotters, producing a white rot. Most occur on dead wood, but they can also be weakly parasitic on living wood. The majority of species grow on broadleaf trees and shrubs, but a few grow on conifers. Fruit bodies occur singly, in clusters, or in tiers. 

The genus has a global distribution, with some species confined to the tropics, others to north temperate regions, and others to south temperate regions.

Uses
At least three species are commercially cultivated for food on a large scale in China and East Asia. They include Auricularia heimuer (black wood ear), formerly misdetermined as Auricularia auricula-judae; Auricularia cornea (wood ear or cloud ear), also called A. polytricha; and Auricularia villosula.
 
Other species are eaten locally around the world. A study on the use of fungi by the Bini people of southern Nigeria found that the local inhabitants collected and ate a species similar to A. auricula-judae, but that it was not one of the fungi they used medicinally. Collection of Auricularia species has also been documented in Nepal. However, the Nepalese do not consider them all that good for eating; of the three grades given to edible fungi, they were given the worst. Additional places where Auricularia species have been recorded as locally gathered and consumed include Benin, Chile, Fiji, Ghana, Guatemala, India, Indonesia, Madagascar, Mexico, Mozambique, and Poland. 

Several species, including the Asian cultivated species and the European A. auricula-judae (jelly ear or jew's ear), have been used in traditional medicine. They have also been investigated for potential pharmaceutical use.

Species

References

Auriculariales
Agaricomycetes genera